Buckskin Mountain is a summit in the U.S. state of Nevada.

Buckskin Mountain was named for the fact the summit has the color of buckskin. A variant name was "Buckskin Peak".

References

Mountains of Humboldt County, Nevada